Rolf Wolfshohl (born 27 December 1938) is a former professional road bicycle racing and cyclo-cross racing cyclist from Germany. Wolfshohl is best known in cyclo-cross for winning the world championship three times, and in road racing for winning the 1965 Vuelta a España. He won the German National Road Race in 1968.

Biography
Wolfshohl started competing in cycling from 1953 at the age of 15 and won his first race in 1954. In 1956 Wolfshohl became Junior Champion of West Germany. The head of the velodrome in Dortmund, Otto Wederlin, wanted to turn Wolfshohl into a great six day track rider but Wolfshohl preferred cyclo-cross and road racing. Between 1957 and 1973, Wolfshohl took part fifteen times in the World Cyclo-Cross Championships where he won twelve medals. Three of these were gold. The first time that he reached the podium in the World championships of cyclo-cross was the bronze medal in 1958 behind the Frenchman André Dufraisse and the Italian Amerigo Severini.

In 1960 and at the age of 21, he won the rainbow jersey in Tolosa, Spain. Initially Italian Renato Longo and Swiss Arnold Hungerbühler took a small lead in the race but halfway into the race, Wolfshohl bridged to the pair and then got away to win the gold medal. A year later he prolonged his title in Hanover. The course was said to have been made or designed especially for Wolfshohl. The UCI instructed that the course be made tougher but Wolfshohl was in great form and spent most of the race alone at the front. Longo came back to Wolfshohl in the second last lap but with an acceleration Wolfshohl dropped the Italian. In 1962 Wolfshohl was sick and could not finish the World Championship race.

In 1963 in Calais in France, Wolfshohl won his third and final world cyclo-cross title. In the first lap, Wolfshohl created a gap and got away to win the race. In the following years Wolfshohl focused more on road racing, using cyclo-cross in the winter. He competed and won medals in the World Championships but never the gold. In 1968 Wolfshohl had to return his silver medal at the Cyclo-cross World Championships because of a positive doping test.

Wolfshohl became a professional road racer in 1960 by the Rapha-Gitane team. In 1962 he was beaten in a two-man sprint by Jef Planckaert in Liège–Bastogne–Liège. At that time Liège–Bastogne–Liège and La Flèche Wallonne were run on successive days as "Le Weekend Ardennais." Wolfshohl came seventh in La Flèche Wallonne and as a result won Le Weekend Ardennais in 1962. In the World Championships road race of that year, Wolfshohl finished fourth behind Jean Stablinski of France. In 1963 Milan–San Remo Wolfshohl and Joseph Groussard sprinted for the win. The sprint was very close and at first Wolfshohl was declared the winner but then Groussard was declared the winner.

In the 1965 Vuelta a España while riding in the Mercier cycling team of defending champion Raymond Poulidor, Wolfshohl took the leaders jersey off his team leader on the eighth stage. Wolfshohl showed himself to be the strongest in the race and kept the leader's jersey to the finish where he won with six minutes advantage over Poulidor. As a road racer, Wolfshohl also won two stages in the Tour de France, the West German road race championships and Paris–Nice. His win in Paris–Nice was by just three seconds over Ferdinand Bracke.

In the 1968 Tour de France Wolfshohl won the yellow jersey after the 16th stage. In the 18th stage, Wolfshohl crashed on a descent and had to wait for his teammate. Wolfshohl would finish the race sixth.

In total he won 140 road races and 110 cyclo-cross races. He retired in 1975 and began a bike shop. From 1995 until 2000 he was involved in the organisation of the Rund um Köln.  After his career, he worked in his own company (trade with bicycles) in Köln.

Major results

1958
 1st  West German Cyclo-Cross championship
 3rd (Bronze), World cyclo-cross championship
1959
 1st  West German Cyclo-Cross championship
 2nd (Silver), World cyclo-cross championship
1960
 1st  (Gold), World cyclo-cross championship
 1st  West German Cyclo-Cross championship
1961
 1st  (Gold), World cyclo-cross championship
 1st  West German Cyclo-Cross championship
1962
 1st  West German Cyclo-Cross championship
 1st GP de la Bicicleta Eibarresa
 1st Tour of the Basque Country
1963
 1st  (Gold), World cyclo-cross championship
 1st  West German Road Race championship
 1st  West German Cyclo-Cross championship
 1st Grand Prix du Parisien
1965
 1st, Overall, 1965 Vuelta a España
 2nd (Silver), World cyclo-cross championship
 1st  West German Cyclo-Cross championship
1966
 1st  West German Cyclo-Cross championship
 3rd (Bronze), World cyclo-cross championship
1967
 1st  West German Cyclo-Cross championship
Tour de France:
Winner stage 15
 2nd (Silver), World cyclo-cross championship
1968
 1st  West German Road Race championship
 1st  West German Cyclo-Cross championship
 6th, Overall, Tour de France
 1st Paris–Nice
1969
 1st  West German Cyclo-Cross championship
 2nd (Silver), World cyclo-cross championship
1970
 1st  West German Cyclo-Cross championship
 3rd (Bronze), World cyclo-cross championship
Tour de France:
Winner stage 20A
1971
 1st  West German Cyclo-Cross championship
1972
 2nd (Silver), World cyclo-cross championship
1973
 1st  West German Cyclo-Cross championship
 3rd (Bronze), World cyclo-cross championship

References

External links 

Official Tour de France results for Rolf Wolfshohl
 History world championship cyclo-cross

1938 births
Living people
German male cyclists
Cyclo-cross cyclists
Vuelta a España winners
German Tour de France stage winners
Cyclists from Cologne
UCI Cyclo-cross World Champions (men)
German cycling road race champions
German Vuelta a España stage winners
20th-century German people